The 1974 Cork Intermediate Hurling Championship was the 65th staging of the Cork Intermediate Hurling Championship since its establishment by the Cork County Board in 1909. The draw for the opening round fixtures took place at the Cork Convention on 27 January 1974. The championship ran from 5 May to 29 September 1974.

On 29 September 1974, Bandon won the championship following a 2-07 to 1-06 defeat of Midleton in the final. This was their second championship title overall and their first title since 1952.

Bandon's Noel Crowley was the championship's top scorer with 2-25.

Results

First round

Quarter-finals

Semi-finals

Final

References

Cork Intermediate Hurling Championship
Cork Intermediate Hurling Championship